Andrei Danilov (born 1978) is a Russian conductor.

Early life
Danilov was born in Saint Petersburg (Leningrad) where he attended piano lessons at the Special School of Music of the Rimsky-Korsakov Conservatoire. From 1995 to 2000 he was faculty of opera and symphony there under guidance from conductor Ilya Musin and then Yuri Temirkanov. Later on, he became a conductor of the National Opera and Ballet of Belarus where he conducted such performances as The Marriage of Figaro, Mavra and Eugene Onegin, and in memory of Ilya Musin he conducted numerous of performances at the Mariinsky Theatre Orchestra.

Career

2001-2002
From 2000 to 2002 he became an intern at the Royal Northern College of Music in Manchester, England and have appeared several times with various music ensembles and operas such as Falstaff and The Queen of Spades. As of July 2001 he was an occasional member of the Northern Sinfonia of Newcastle upon Tyne and in 2002 made his debut as a conductor of both the Academic Symphony Orchestra and Shostakovich Philharmonic of Saint Petersburg.

2003-2005
From 2003 to 2005 Danilov was an assistant conductor of the Caucasian Symphonic Orchestra at Mineralnye Vody and was also an Amadeus Chamber Orchestra's music director. Between 2003 and 2005 he was conductor of the Academic Symphonic Orchestra of Saint Petersburg and conducted an opening ceremony of the Spanish Music Festival the same year. In 2005 he began working with the Novosibirsk Opera and Ballet Theatre with which he had performances in France, South Korea, China, and Thailand in which he conducted such ballets as Igor Stravinsky's Apollo and Pulcinella as well as Ludwig Minkus's La Bayadère and Tchaikovsky's Serenade.

2005-2009
From 2005 to 2006 he made his first appearance in Moscow where he was a conductor of the State Academic Symphony Orchestra of the Russian Federation along with Yevgeny Svetlanov. In 2007 he performed Gustav Mahler's Symphony No. 2 at the Moscow Conservatory's great hall with Russian National Philharmonic Orchestra. From 2008 to 2009 he was a guest conductor at the Mikhailovsky Theatre and after he retired from there was awarded the Golden Mask award.

References

1978 births
Living people
21st-century Russian conductors (music)
Russian male conductors (music)
21st-century Russian male musicians
Musicians from Saint Petersburg